David Strong is an American philosopher and educator. He is a Professor of Philosophy and Environmental Studies at Rocky Mountain College. Strong has been noted as a disciple of Albert Borgmann; Strong explores Borgmann's ideas on technology within the context of a philosophy of wilderness in his book, Crazy Mountains.

Education 
Strong received his B.A. degree in philosophy from the University of Montana, and his PhD degree in philosophy from the State University of New York at Stony Brook.

Books 
Crazy Mountains
Technology and the Good Life?

See also
American philosophy
List of American philosophers

References

American philosophers
University of Montana alumni
Stony Brook University alumni
Rocky Mountain College faculty
Living people
Year of birth missing (living people)